Cielo (Spanish and Italian for "heaven" or "sky"), El Cielo (in Spanish) or Il Cielo (in Italian) may refer to:

Art, entertainment, and media
 Cielo (film), a 2017 Chile-Canadian documentary film
 Cielo (TV channel), an Italian television channel

Music
 Cielo (album), a 2003 album by Benny Ibarra
 Cielo, 1960 song by Jenny Luna
 El Cielo (album), an album by Dredg
 El Cielo (band), a rock band from Argentina

Companies and organizations
 Cielo (company), a distributor and manufacturer of frozen yogurt
 Cielo (supercomputer), at Los Alamos National Laboratory
 Cielo (water), a brand of bottled water
 Cielo S.A., a Brazilian credit card operator

Vehicles
 Chery Cielo, Chinese compact car
 Daewoo Cielo, a Korean compact car

Other uses
 César Cielo (born 1987), Brazilian freestyle swimmer
 El Cielo Biosphere Reserve, in Tamaulipas state, Mexico

See also
 Scielo, the Scientific Electronic Library Online